Annie Allen was a medical missionary from England. She was the daughter and granddaughter of missionaries.  Allen worked primarily with the Universities' Mission to Central Africa (which  later became the United Mission to Central Africa) in their hospitals at Mkunazini and Zanzibar.

Allen was the director of the hospital in Mkunazini. Though she was mainly concerned with the health of the people she served, she also pushed for the education of the women and children of the areas where she worked. She founded the Zenana Mission in Zanzibar through the UMCA. The main goal of the Universities' Mission to Central Africa (UMCA) was evangelistic. They were an Anglo-Catholic organization.

Work with the ill and injured

The Universities' Mission to Central Africa was founded in 1860 at the request of "the great David Livingston." It was originally a mission for the people around Lake Nyassa, but it quickly grew. The main goal of the mission was always evangelistic, but they also spent a lot of time bringing education and health care to the people of the region.

Although Allen worked on all three major aspects of this mission, her primary focus was as medical missionary. She came to Mkunazini alongside Bishop Steere and twenty other workers on 11 February, 1875. Of these twenty workers, Allen was put in charge of the hospital. She was helped by only two other nurses. They were horribly understaffed, and it was up to Allen to pick up the slack. Her work was not confined to the hospital. The bishop would travel to nearby villages to spread the gospel and give advice. Allen accompanied him on these trips and would tend to the medical needs of the growing crowds.

Allen continued working in Mkunazini for the next 10 years and faced a variety of difficulties. The hospital was subject to flood and war. This made it even more difficult for Allen to do her medical work. In August 1888 she, along with Sister Agnes, Sister Anne Margaret, Sister Mary Elizabeth, and Mr. Gill, journeyed to Maglia. They traveled by donkey for over a week before reaching their destination. They had been in Maglia less than a month when tragedy struck. On November 5, 1888 the Great Fire hit the mission in Maglia. Many structures were lost including many houses and half of the newly built hospital. Allen, as the only doctor in the village at the time, cared for all of the injuries sustained in the fire. In addition to these burns, she sought to cure the rampant illness that resulted from the villagers living so close together during the rainy season. The patients she dealt with were on-edge because war in the region seemed to be more and more inevitable.

On 6 January, 1889, another fire ravaged the mission at Maglia. Six weeks later, on 18 February, a tornado hit the village and did substantial damage to the newly rebuilt hospital. The rain that came after the tornado damaged what remained of the hospital. The downpour caused mud from the roof to coat everything below. Then, on 27 February, the war between Kimweri and Kibanga came to Maglia - 400 Masai warriors descended upon the village. This war lasted until 7 March, when Archdeacon Farier made peace with Kimweri. Allen continued to care for the people of Maglia through these tumultuous times.

Evangelistic work with women and children
Allen not only help people medically, but she was also involved in many outreach programs with Zenana Missions. In 1878 she started one such mission in Zanzibar. She worked extensively with the people of Zanzibar and considered it her home. She recruited Miss Hinton, and the two women used the mission to spread Christianity. Hinton helped run the Mission's nursery because, "the nation comes from the nursery" where there can be "a firm foothold for Christianity." The two women spent a lot of time with the children of Zanzibar making sure they had a proper Christian education.

Allen also visited the mothers to read Bible stories. She was especially successful in converting these Muslim women by pointing out the many similarities between their religion and the Genesis stories in the Bible. She employed the same technique when she later worked with the Copts of Cairo. The Church Mission Society (CMS) was especially concerned with how superstitious the Copts had become. She was not as successful with converting this group.

Like many Zenana Missions, Allen's missions later became less evangelistic and more focused on educating women and young girls. One of the skills she taught them was sewing. She gave them the skills and materials necessary to mend their own clothes, thereby making them more self-sufficient.

In a letter detailing her 1906 trip to Yinege, Allen details some of the other skills and values they taught women. She remarks that she was impressed by their "lady like manner and neat dress." She also was very happy to report that the women seemed receptive toward Christianity. In all of her years as a Zenanan missionary, these were the characteristics she expected to see in women who were served by similar establishments.

References

British Christian missionaries
Christian medical missionaries
Female Christian missionaries
Year of birth missing
Year of death missing
Place of birth missing
Place of death missing